Durham University Men's Lacrosse Club represents the University of Durham in the sport of lacrosse.

History
Durham University Men's Lacrosse Club has existed for a number of years.  The most recent incarnation of the club began in the early 2000s, with the club competing in the now defunct Anglo-Scottish League  This was followed by competing in the initial BUSA precursor league & Regional Tournaments, and then being an ever present in the BUCS leagues.

From 2009, the university side has been supported by a number of American students who are encouraged to come to the UK to continue playing their chosen sport whilst pursuing a 1-year Master's degree.  These students are expected to represent the university throughout the season, whilst also taking on some responsibility for development of existing a new players.

The club welcomes both experienced and new players, and has alumni playing for a variety of UK clubs.  The club has participated in a number of tournaments, including the Bath 8s in 2007, and tours to tournaments in Dublin & Salou.

In 2012, Durham University Men's Lacrosse Club was awarded English Lacrosse High Performance University status.

In 2014, Durham was defeated by the England Men's National Team. In 2017, Durham defeated the England Men's National Team.

The team competes in the Cathedral Cup against Pellicani Bocconi Lacrosse. They are set to play Reading University Men’s Lacrosse first team in what will be a challenging fixture for Durham.

The club successfully run a mixed tournament every year, playing without pitch boundaries.  The club has also assisted in facilitating a large intra-mural mixed lacrosse league between the colleges of the university, providing further opportunities for new players to take up the game.

Notable alumni
Durham Men's Lacrosse has a history of producing athletes who have been involved in lacrosse at the international level:

In addition, several players have been involved with lacrosse at the professional level:

References

2008 establishments in England
English lacrosse teams
Clubs and societies of Durham University
Sport at Durham University